The Masters world records in swimming are ratified by FINA, the international governing body of swimming. Records can be set by registered Masters competitors. The minimum age is 25 years in long course (50 metres) or short course (25 metres) swimming pools.

Long course

Men
Key:

Freestyle

Backstroke

Breaststroke

Butterfly

Individual medley

Relay

Women
Key:

Freestyle

Backstroke

Breaststroke

Butterfly

Individual medley

Relay

Mixed Relay

Short Course

Men
Key:

Freestyle

Backstroke

Breaststroke

Butterfly

Individual medley

Relay

Women
Key:

Freestyle

Backstroke

Breaststroke

Butterfly

Individual medley

Relay

Mixed Relay

Notes

References 
General
 
 
Specific

External links
Masters Rules on FINA web site
Masters All Time Top Ten - Long Course
Masters All Time Top Ten - Short Course

Masters
Masters swimming